Skenfrith is a small village in Monmouthshire, south-east Wales. The road through the village (B4521) was once the A40, linking Ross-on-Wye and Abergavenny.

History and amenities 
The Welsh placename Ynysgynwraidd, from which the English name derives, means "island of Cynfraeth", possibly a local 6th century leader.

Skenfrith Castle is one of the Three (or 'trilateral') Castles – with Grosmont Castle and White Castle – built in the area after the Norman conquest by Marcher Lords to subjugate and dominate this part of the turbulent Welsh Marches into the medieval period.  The castle was substantially rebuilt by Hubert de Burgh between 1219 and 1223, but by 1538 it was abandoned and in ruins.

St. Bridget's Church, Skenfrith was first mentioned in 1207, and was reconstructed and enlarged in the 14th century. The church has a squat tower and large buttress.  The whole is listed Grade1.   The interior has a Jacobean pew and the tomb of the last governor of the Three Castles. It also holds the Skenfrith Cope, an embroidered vestment of red velvet and linen which has been dated to the late 15th century.  Its design shows the Assumption of the Virgin, surrounded by angels and saints.

The village gave its name to one of the historic hundreds of Monmouthshire.

The Bell at Skenfrith, originally a 17th-century coaching inn, was voted Michelin 2007 Pub of the Year, for the whole of Great Britain.

Skenfrith was used as the location for the fictional village of "Upper Leadworth" in the Doctor Who episodes "Amy's Choice", broadcast on 22 May 2010 and the related Doctor Who Confidential episode "Arthurian Legend".  In the episode quoted Skenfrith was labelled as the village which time forgot.

In 2022 Skenfrith became a community.

Friends of St. Bridget's
There is an active secular charity, the Friends of St. Bridget's, Skenfrith, which supports the repair and maintenance of the church and has raised funds, in particular for the recent conservation project and new display and conservation of the pre-reformation cope. Patrons include the Lord Lieutenant of Gwent Simon Boyle, Sara Fulgoni and Sir Roy Strong.

References

External links 
 The Skenfrith church and village website
 Castle Wales website on Skenfrith Castle

Villages in Monmouthshire
Communities in Monmouthshire